Shmashana Adhipati is a name given to a deity either male or female and also together as a consort, who rules Shmashana, cremation ground. The Shamashana Adhipati literally translates to Lord of Shmashana. The name Shmashan Adhipathi is given to different deities in Hinduism and Tibetan Buddhism.

In Hinduism

Shiva is considered to be Lord of Shmashana or Shmashana Adhipati. One epithet for Shiva is "inhabitant of the cremation ground" (Sanskrit: śmaśānavāsin, also spelled Shmashanavasin), referring to this connection. Kali, his consort is known by another name Shmashana Kali. Kali's association with blackness stands in contrast to her consort, Shiva, whose body is covered by the white ashes of the cremation ground in which he meditates, and with which Kali is also associated, as Shmashana Kali is also a protector. She can be used to chase away bad spirits. Thus, together Shiva and Kali are they deity associated with Shmashana as per Hindu religion are called Shmashana Adhipati. Also Bhairava, another manifestation of Shiva and his consort Bhairavi are said to live in Shmashana. The Mahavidya goddesses of Hindu and Tantric cult are said to rule over Smashan.

In Tantrik cult, Shmashana, emerged to be a main area of their experiments called Shava sadhana. Aghoris and Kapalika are some of the people who indulge in such rituals in Shmashana. They invoke  Kali, Tara, Yogini, Chausath Yogini, Dakini, Bhairava, Bhairavi and ghosts like Vetala, Pishacha, Brahm-Rakshasha and worship them, give them sacrifices in Shmashana to have occult powers. They consider these deities as Shmashana Adhipati.

In Tibetan Buddhism

Further, as per Tibetan Buddhist script a couple known as Shmashana Adhipati (Standard Tibetan: pal dur tro dag po yab yum. English: the Glorious Lords of the Charnel Ground - Father-Mother) also called Chitipati is considered Lord of Shmashana. They arise from the Secret Essence Wheel Tantra and is associated with the collection/cycle of Cakrasaṃvara Tantra. Primarily employed as a wealth practice, with emphasis on protecting from thieves, they also serve as the special protector for the Vajrayogini 'Naro Khechari' practice. Shri Shmashana Adhipati is now common, to a greater or lesser extent, in all the New (Sarma) Schools of Himalayan and Tibetan influenced Buddhism. It is important not to confuse the protector deities Shri Shmashana Adhipati, Father & Mother, with the skeleton dancers found in the various systems of Tibetan religious Cham dance. The word Chitipati  again has its origin from word Chita (funeral pyre as per Hindu rites). 

Dakini, Shakini and some other tantric deities, associated both with Hinduism and Tibetan Buddhism, are said to roam in Shmashana.

References

Indian words and phrases
Hindu deities
Tibetan Buddhist deities
Death deities